Wroxeter may refer to:

 Wroxeter, England
 Wroxeter, Ontario, Canada
 Wroxeter, British Columbia, Canada